Jagdishpur Assembly constituency is one of 243 legislative assembly seats of legislative assembly of Bihar. It is part of  Arrah Lok Sabha constituency along with other assembly constituencies viz Barhara, Arrah, Tarari, Sandesh, Shahpur and Agiaon (SC).

Area/wards
Jagdishpur Assembly constituency comprises:

 Jagdishpur CD block
 Gram Panchayats: Ayar, Tar, Dhwarahi Jangal Mahal, Akrua, Kothua, Jamuaon, Jitaura Jangalmahal, Brawn, Tilath, Khannikala, Rajeyan, Amehta, Ktriyan, Lahthan, Agiaon and Nayka Tola Jangalmahal of Piro CD block.

Members of the Legislative Assembly
The list of the Members of the Legislative Assembly (MLA) representing Jagdishpur constituency is as follows:

Election results

2020

References

External links
 

Politics of Bhojpur district, India
Assembly constituencies of Bihar